White Flannels is a lost 1927 American drama film directed by Lloyd Bacon and starring Louise Dresser, Jason Robards Sr., Virginia Brown Faire, Warner Richmond, George Nichols and Brooks Benedict. It was written by C. Graham Baker. The film was released by Warner Bros. on March 19, 1927.

Cast       
Louise Dresser as Mrs. Jacob Politz
Jason Robards Sr. as Frank Politz
Virginia Brown Faire as Anne
Warner Richmond as Ed
George Nichols as Jacob Politz
Brooks Benedict as Paul
Rose Blossom as Berenice Nolden
Rosemary Cooper as Paul's Sister

References

External links
 

1927 films
1920s English-language films
Silent American drama films
1927 drama films
Warner Bros. films
Films directed by Lloyd Bacon
American silent feature films
American black-and-white films
1920s American films